Channel 5 is an English-language free-to-air terrestrial television channel in Singapore, owned by state media conglomerate Mediacorp. The channel primarily airs general entertainment and news programming in the English language.

The channel began broadcasting on 15 February 1963 as the pilot service TV Singapura, the region's first television service. It officially launched on 2 April 1963.

History
The channel first launched as a pilot service, TV Singapura, on 15 February 1963. Minister for Culture S. Rajaratnam introduced its inaugural night of programming (which included the documentary TV Looks at Singapore, imported cartoons and comedy programmes, the Malay variety show Rampaian Malaysia, and news), stating that "tonight might well mark the start of a social and cultural revolution in our lives." The pilot service would broadcast 100 minutes of programmes per-night. At the time, it was estimated that only one in 58 persons in Singapore owned a television set.

On 2 April 1963, the channel was inaugurated by President Yusof Ishak as TV Singapura Channel 5. It expanded its broadcast day to four hours per-night, broadcasting from 7:15 p.m. to 11:15 p.m. SGT in the four official languages. On 31 August 1963, a second channel, Channel 8, began test broadcasts, which would carry Chinese and Tamil-language programming, leaving Channel 5 focused on English and Malay programming.

In January 1964, Channel 5 and 8 became regional affiliates of Radio Televisyen Malaysia. Following Singapore's separation from Malaysia, Channel 5 and Channel 8 became part of the new state broadcaster Radio Television Singapore, and was subsequently rebranded as RTS Channel 5. Both channels moved to Television Centre on Caldecott Hill on 26 August 1966.

In 1974, Channel 5 began experimental colour broadcasts, including live coverage of the 1974 FIFA World Cup final. Channel 5 broadcast its first domestic programme in colour, the National Day Parade, on 9 August.

On 1 February 1980, RTS was restructured as the Singapore Broadcasting Corporation, being separated from the Ministry of Culture into a statutory corporation.

Stereo broadcasts debuted on Channel 5 and its sister channels on 1 August 1990.

On 1 January 1994, Malay-language programmes were moved to Channel 12, and Channel 5 was relaunched as a full-time English-language service. On 29 August 1994, the channel launched AM Singapore, Singapore's first English-language breakfast programme.

On 1 November 2014, Channel 5 announced a planned expansion of local original programming, including more current affairs programming focusing on Singapore (including the weeknight talkshow The 5 Show), a "local serial drama", and a new talent search competition.

On 1 May 2019, Channel 5 replaced its morning and afternoon schedule (which primarily featured simulcasts of Channel NewsAsia) with the children's programming block Okto on 5 (replacing the Okto channel, which was discontinued).

Programming 
 List of programmes broadcast by Channel 5 (Singapore)

References

External links 
 

1963 establishments in Singapore
Mediacorp
Television stations in Singapore
Television channels and stations established in 1963